Khin Than Nu (born 7 December 1945) is a Myanmar Motion Picture Academy Awards-winning Burmese actress, winning Best Actress in 1967, 1990 and 2000.

Early life
Khin Than Nu was born on December 7, 1945 in Pyinmana, Burma to parent U Aung Than and Daw Nu, as the eldest of four children.

Career
She began her career, after winning the 1961 Miss Pyidaungzu Beauty Pageant. Her debut film was Tint Hla Pay Han (တင့်လှပေဟန်), directed by Maung Thin (မောင်သင်).

Khin Than Nu was romantically involved with many well-known actors in the Burmese movie industry, including Shwe Ba, Tin Nyunt, Win Oo, Sein Myint and Myat Lay. In 1975, she married Colonel Maung Maung Khin and had a son, Wai Yan Min Khin.  She gave birth to a daughter, Hnin Hla Nu.

In 1988, Khin Than Nu divorced Colonel Maung Maung Khin and married Dr. Myat Thura Soe. And their daughter Myat Than Nu Soe was born.

Filmography
Maung Doe Cherry Myay (1963)
Maung Mu Paing Shin (1964)
Ko Yal Toe Yal Soe Soe Yal (1967)
Kyaukme A Kyin Thar (1969)
Hmone Shwe Yee (1970)
Kanyar Pyo Nae Zayar Ao (1972)
Thingyan Moe (1985)
Khun Hna Sin A Lwan (1990)
Thamee Shin (2000)

Awards

References

External links

Burmese film actresses
Living people
20th-century Burmese actresses
People from Mandalay Region
1945 births